From 1793 to 1827 and again from 1829 to 1845, Georgia elected all its Representatives in Congress from a single multi-member at-large congressional district.

From 1793 to 1803 Georgia elected 2 Representatives at large.
From 1803 to 1813 Georgia elected 4 Representatives at large.
From 1813 to 1823 Georgia elected 6 Representatives at large.
From 1823 to 1826 and again from 1829 to 1833 Georgia elected 7 Representatives at large.
From 1833 to 1843 Georgia elected 9 Representatives at large.
From 1843 to 1845 Georgia elected 8 Representatives at large.

Briefly, from 1883 to 1885, Georgia elected one of its representatives at large, with the remainder being elected from districts.

List of members representing the district 
The at-large district was created in 1793 from district representation.

Notes

External links 
 Election results and OurCampaigns.com

References

 Congressional Biographical Directory of the United States 1774–present

At-large
Former congressional districts of the United States
At-large United States congressional districts